This is a list of 315 species in the genus Lachesilla.

Lachesilla species

References

Lists of insect species